Macromia taeniolata, the royal river cruiser is a species of dragonfly in the family Macromiidae. It is a long, slender insect with bright green eyes and a dark brown body with yellow stripes. The sexes are alike. It is found along large streams and rivers.

References

Macromiidae
Taxa named by Jules Pierre Rambur
Insects described in 1842